Bakur Kvezereli (born January 5, 1981) is a Georgian-American entrepreneur. He is a co-founder of specialty food marketplace Maiaki and autonomous electric tractor startup Ztractor.

Early years and Education
Kvezereli was born on January 5, 1981, in Tbilisi, Georgia. His great grandfather George Kvezereli was a member of European trade guild and owner of multinational salt trading company. He was a philanthropist and financial supporter of Tbilisi State University. Kvezereli's maternal grandmother was a Polish Jewish, daughter of Brest Jewish community activist. 80% of Brest Jewish became victims of the Brest Ghetto in October 1942.

Bakur Kvezereli is a graduate of Massachusetts Institute of Technology (MIT). He is the Mastercard and Legatum Fellow.

Career and awards
Before emigrating to the United States Bakur was working on agriculture and food trade policy in different counties including Romania, Kenya and his motherland Georgia. Where he held a position of the Minister of Agriculture in 2008–2011. For the exceptional service he was awarded The Presidential Order of Excellence and Order of Honor.

See also 

Georgian-Americans
List of Georgians
Cabinet of Georgia

References

1981 births
Living people